The Ladakhi–Balti languages or Western Archaic Tibetan languages are a subgroup of the Tibetic languages spoken in the Ladakh region of India and in the Gilgit-Baltistan territory of Pakistan. The lects lack mutual intelligibility and are considered separate languages by their speakers. The grouping includes:

 Ladakhi (Ladakh)
 Zangskari (Ladakh)
 Purgi (Ladakh, Baltistan)
 Balti (Baltistan, Ladakh)
 Changthang (Tibet, Ladakh, Baltistan)

Proto-Western Tibetan has been reconstructed by Backstrom (1994).

See also
List of Proto-Western Tibetan reconstructions (Wiktionary)

References

Languages of Ladakh
Languages of Gilgit-Baltistan
Languages of Pakistan
Bodish languages